The 2012 World Outdoor Bowls Championship women's singles was held at the Lockleys Bowling Club in Adelaide, Australia. Some of the qualifying Rounds were held at the nearby Holdfast Bowling Club in Glenelg North.

Karen Murphy won the women's singles Gold.

Section tables

Pool 1

Pool 2

Finals

Results

References

2012 in Australian women's sport
Wom
Wor